5-Hydroxyhydantoin is an oxidation product of 2′-deoxycytidine. If not repaired, it may be processed by DNA polymerases that induce mutagenic processes.

References

Hydantoins